Melanie MacKay (born 16 August 1959) is a Canadian former swimmer. She competed in the women's 200 metre breaststroke at the 1976 Summer Olympics in Montreal. She now coaches at the Oakville Aquatics Club in Oakville, Ontario.

References

External links
 
 
 

1959 births
Living people
Canadian female swimmers
Olympic swimmers of Canada
Swimmers at the 1976 Summer Olympics
Sportspeople from Burlington, Ontario
20th-century Canadian women
21st-century Canadian women